Floating note may refer to:

 Message in a bottle

See also
 Adjustable-rate mortgage
 Drifter (floating device)
 Floater (disambiguation)
 Floating rate (disambiguation)
 Floating rate note
 Inverse floating rate note